After Cezanne is a large irregular shaped obtuse painting begun in 1999 and completed in 2000 by the British artist Lucian Freud. The top left section of this painting has been 'grafted' on to the main section below, and closer inspection reveals a horizontal line where these two sections were joined.

The painting is one in a select group of canvases where Freud engages in a dialogue with past masters, this work being a variation on a theme of the work L'Après-midi à Naples (circa 1875) by the French Post-Impressionist painter Paul Cézanne.

In 2001 the work was purchased by the National Gallery of Australia in Canberra, which also owns Cézanne's L'Après-midi à Naples, for $7.4 million.

References

2000 paintings
Paintings by Lucian Freud
Collections of the National Gallery of Australia